Chalfant Church is a historic church in Warsaw in Coshocton County, Ohio.  It was the first church in the county;  the county was formed in 1810.

The current building, built in 1893, was built on the site of the first church building.  It has been suggested to be the finest rural church in its county.  It is a wood frame "Victorian Gothic" building, built on a sandstone foundation with a cross-shaped plan.  It has intersecting slate-covered gable roofs.  A small cemetery rises up a hill behind.

It was added to the National Register in 1982.

Notes

References

Churches in Ohio
Churches on the National Register of Historic Places in Ohio
Churches completed in 1893
19th-century churches in the United States
Buildings and structures in Coshocton County, Ohio
National Register of Historic Places in Coshocton County, Ohio